Nancy Olson (born March 8, 1957, in Stony Point, New York) is an American wheelchair tennis player . She competed at two Paralympic Games, winning two silver medals.

Career 
She graduated from Slippery Rock University.

At the 1992 Summer Paralympics, she was eliminated in singles in the quarterfinals by Monique Kalkman, while she reached the final in doubles alongside Lynn Seidemann . The two lost to Monique Kalkman and Chantal Vandierendonck to win the silver medal.

At the 1996 Summer Paralympics, she again reached the quarterfinals in singles, where she lost this time to Chantal Vandierendonck. And in doubles, she  won another silver medal, with Hope Lewellen, they moved into the final, which was again won by Monique Kalkman and Chantal Vandierendonck.

From 1993 to 1997, she was ranked in the Top 10, in the world . She played in her last tournament in 1999.

References 

1957 births
Living people
People from Stony Point, New York
Paralympic silver medalists for the United States
Paralympic medalists in wheelchair tennis
Paralympic wheelchair tennis players of the United States
Wheelchair tennis players at the 1992 Summer Paralympics
Wheelchair tennis players at the 1996 Summer Paralympics
Medalists at the 1992 Summer Paralympics
Medalists at the 1996 Summer Paralympics